The Launceston Steam Railway is a  narrow gauge railway, in Cornwall, England. The railway is built on the trackbed of the former standard gauge North Cornwall Railway.

History

Standard gauge railway
The first railway to reach Launceston was the Launceston and South Devon Railway, opened in 1865 from Launceston to Plymouth, and later absorbed into the Great Western Railway.  In 1886 the London and South Western Railway opened its railway from Halwill Junction, extended to Padstow in stages in the 1890s, and later part of the Southern Railway.  The two Launceston stations were side by side: the Great Western closed in 1962 and the Southern in 1966.

Narrow gauge revival
In 1965, Nigel Bowman, a trainee teacher, rescued the steam locomotive Lilian from the Penrhyn Slate Quarry in North Wales, and restored her to working order at his home in Surrey.  He then set about looking for a site to build a railway for Lilian to run on, and settled on Launceston in 1971, after considering a stretch of trackbed from Guildford to Horsham and the Lynton & Barnstaple Railway.  Purchase of the trackbed took several years, and the first  of track opened on Boxing Day 1983.  The railway was extended progressively, the latest opening to Newmills in 1995 bringing the line to its current  length.

Route
The LSR starts at a new station just west of the original LSWR station, which is now an industrial estate.  Launceston station is the main station on the railway, and the sheds and engineering facilities are located here.  The line runs from the station through a cutting, passing under a road bridge and aqueduct carrying a mill leat, before crossing the River Kensey on a two-arch viaduct.  The line is now on an embankment and crosses a bridge over a farm track before arriving at Hunt's Crossing, where it is planned to lay a passing loop.  After Hunt's Crossing the line crosses two farm crossings and then reaches Canna Park which was the temporary terminus before the extension to Newmills.  From Canna Park there is a fairly short run to Newmills, the terminus.  Adjacent to the Newmills station is the Newmills Farm Park.

Locomotives
All public train services are operated by the steam locomotives, whilst the internal combustion locomotives are used for maintenance work.

Steam locomotives

Internal combustion and battery electric

Visiting locomotives

Rolling stock
The railway has four passenger carriages, all built on site and based on those built for the Manx Electric Railway, Torrington and Marland Railway and the Plynlimon and Hafan Tramway.  There are also several ex. Royal Naval Armaments Depot box vans, slate wagons and tipping wagons.

References

External links

 The Railway website
 

Heritage railways in Cornwall
Museums in Cornwall
Railway museums in England
Transport museums in England
1 ft 11½ in gauge railways in England
Standard gauge railways in England
Launceston, Cornwall